is a Japanese judoka.

He won a medal at the 2019 World Judo Championships. He won the 2021 World Judo Championships in the heavyweight division.

In 2017, he won the gold medal in the men's +100 kg event at the Summer Universiade held in Taipei, Taiwan.

In 2020 he became world-renowned for after ending the 10-year unbeaten streak of legendary French judoka Teddy Riner during the 2020 Judo Grand Slam Paris, beating him by an ippon and consequently causing him his first defeat in years.

References

External links
 

1995 births
Living people
Japanese male judoka
World judo champions
Judoka at the 2018 Asian Games
Asian Games gold medalists for Japan
Asian Games medalists in judo
Medalists at the 2018 Asian Games
Universiade medalists in judo
Universiade gold medalists for Japan
Medalists at the 2017 Summer Universiade
20th-century Japanese people
21st-century Japanese people
Jacket Wrestlers